Madison Wolfe (born October 16, 2002) is an American actress. She made her film debut in the adventure drama On the Road (2012) and her television debut in the HBO series True Detective (2014). She starred in the horror film The Conjuring 2 (2016), and as Barbara Thorson in the fantasy/drama film I Kill Giants (2017).

Life and career
Wolfe was born on October 16, 2002, in Metairie, Louisiana. Her sister, Meghan, is also an actress.

Wolfe made her film debut in the adventure drama film On The Road portraying the role of Dodie Lee. She then appeared in The Campaign and Devil's Due. Wolfe appeared in Joy as the younger version of Elisabeth Röhm's character. 

She then appeared in The Conjuring 2, directed by James Wan. The film was released on June 10, 2016. She starred in I Kill Giants opposite Zoe Saldana directed by Anders Walter.

Filmography

Film

Television

References

External links

21st-century American actresses
American child actresses
American film actresses
American television actresses
Living people
People from Jefferson Parish, Louisiana
Actresses from Louisiana
Year of birth missing (living people)